Walter Herrmann Heinrich (born June 26, 1979) is an Argentine former professional basketball player. He is listed at 6'9" and 225 lbs. He was a key member of the senior men's Argentine national basketball team that won the gold medal during the 2004 Summer Olympic Games.

Professional career

Argentina
Herrmann began his pro career in the top-tier level Argentine League with Olimpia Venado Tuerto in 1996. He played there until the year 2000. He won two Argentine League slam dunk contests during that time in 1999 and 2000, and the Argentine League Revelation of the Year award (best rookie) in 1999. In 2000, he moved to the Argentine club Atenas Córdoba, and he played there until 2002. With Atenas, he was named the MVP of the Argentine League regular season in 2001, and the MVP of the Argentine League Finals in 2002.

After a 16 month long hiatus from last playing basketball in Spain, during the 2009–2010 season; Herrmann returned to Argentina in 2011, to play in a local regional minor league with Unión Deportiva de Venado Tuerto. He spent the 2013–14 season with Atenas de Córdoba. He was the Argentine League's MVP in 2014.

After playing in the Brazilian League, during the 2014–15 season, he spent the 2015–16 season with the Argentine club San Lorenzo, with whom he won the Argentine League championship, and the Argentine League's Finals MVP award. He moved to the Argentine League club Obras Sanitarias, for the 2016–17 season. He moved to the Argentine club Atenas de Córdoba, prior to the 2018–19 season.

Spain
Herrmann moved to the Spanish ACB League club Baloncesto Fuenlabrada for the 2002–03 season. He was named the regular season ACB League MVP that year. He then moved the Spanish club Unicaja Málaga and he played there until the year 2006. Then he moved on to the NBA (National Basketball Association). He returned to the Spanish League in July 2009, when he signed a 4-year contract worth €5.05 million euros net income with Saski Baskonia. The last two years of the contract being team options.

NBA
In 2006, Herrmann signed a one-year contract worth $1.8 million with a team option for a 2nd year to play for the NBA's Charlotte Bobcats during the 2006–07 NBA season Herrmann won the NBA Eastern Conference Rookie of the Month Award in March 2007. In his 13 March games, Herrmann averaged 12.1 points and 4.2 rebounds per game and he shot 58.5 percent from the field and 47.2 percent from 3-point range.

Herrmann finished the 2006–07 NBA season averaging 9.2 points per game and 2.9 rebounds per game. Walter scored his NBA career-high 30 points against the Milwaukee Bucks on April 14 and also grabbed a career high 7 defensive rebounds in the same game. Walter made the NBA All-Rookie Second Team along with his teammate Adam Morrison at the end of the season. After the season was over, the Bobcats activated their team option on Herrmann for the 2007–08 NBA season, paying him $1.944 million.

On December 14, 2007, Herrmann, along with center Primož Brezec, was traded to the Detroit Pistons in exchange for center Nazr Mohammed. On August 2, 2008, it was announced that Herrmann had signed a one-year deal to keep him in Detroit for another season.

Herrmann's final NBA game was in Game 4 of the 2009 Eastern Conference First Round against the Cleveland Cavaliers on April 26th, 2009. In that game, Herrman played for 6 and half minutes and recorded no stats, while Detroit lost the game 78 - 99. Losing Game 4 caused Detroit to lose the series in a 4 - 0 sweep.

Brazil
Herrmann spent the 2014–15 season, playing in the top-tier level Brazilian League, with Flamengo. With Flamengo, he won the 2014 edition of the FIBA Intercontinental Cup, and the Brazilian League's 2014–15 season championship.

National team career
Herrmann was a key reserve for years on the senior men's Argentine national basketball team. With Argentina's national team, he won the gold medal at the 2001 FIBA Americas Championship. He also won the gold medal at the 2004 Summer Olympic Games.

Herrmann also played at the 2006 FIBA World Championship with Argentina's national team. In 2012, he was invited to re-join Argentina's national team. He also played at the 2014 FIBA World Cup.

Personal life
The son of Héctor Herrmann and María Cristina Heinrich, Walter Herrmann is of German descent. He lost his mother, his younger sister and his fiancée in a car accident in July 2003. Exactly one year later, his father died of a heart attack. Herrmann is married to Spanish doctor  Elena, whose father worked in CB Málaga when he played there. They have two children, Barbara (named after Hermann's deceased sister) and Leyton. Hermann also has a son, Federico, from a previous relationship.

NBA career statistics

Regular season

|-
| align="left" | 
| align="left" | Charlotte
| 48 || 12 || 19.5 || .527 || .461 || .774 || 2.9 || .5 || .4 || .1 || 9.2
|-
| align="left" | 
| align="left" | Charlotte
| 17 || 0 || 10.2 || .385 || .346 || .900 || 2.1 || .2 || .2 || .0 || 4.0
|-
| align="left" | 
| align="left" | Detroit
| 28 || 0 || 7.1 || .392 || .289 || .800 || 1.3 || .5 || .1 || .0 || 3.0
|-
| align="left" | 
| align="left" | Detroit
| 59 || 0 || 10.7 || .396 || .342 || .760 || 1.8 || .4 || .1 || .1 || 3.8
|- class="sortbottom"
| style="text-align:center;" colspan="2"| Career
| 152 || 12 || 12.8 || .458 || .381 || .786 || 2.1 || .4 || .2 || .1 || 5.4

Playoffs

|-
| align="left" | 2008
| align="left" | Detroit
| 4 || 0 || 6.8 || .250 || 1.000 || .500 || .3 || .0 || .0 || .0 || 1.3
|-
| align="left" | 2009
| align="left" | Detroit
| 4 || 0 || 5.5 || .375 || .500 || .000 || .3 || .5 || .3 || .0 || 2.0
|- class="sortbottom"
| style="text-align:center;" colspan="2"| Career
| 8 || 0 || 6.1 || .333 || .600 || .500 || .3 || .3 || .1 || .0 || 1.6

References

External links

Walter Herrmann at Basketball-Reference.com
Euroleague.net Profile
Spanish League Profile 
Eurobasket.com Profile
FIBA Profile

1979 births
Living people
Argentine men's basketball players
Argentine expatriate basketball people in the United States
Argentine expatriate sportspeople in Spain
Argentine people of German descent
Atenas basketball players
Baloncesto Fuenlabrada players
Basketball players at the 1999 Pan American Games
Basketball players at the 2004 Summer Olympics
Baloncesto Málaga players
Charlotte Bobcats players
Detroit Pistons players
Flamengo basketball players
Liga ACB players
Medalists at the 2004 Summer Olympics
National Basketball Association players from Argentina
Novo Basquete Brasil players
Olimpia de Venado Tuerto basketball players
Olympic basketball players of Argentina
Olympic gold medalists for Argentina
Olympic medalists in basketball
People from General López Department
Power forwards (basketball)
San Lorenzo de Almagro (basketball) players
Saski Baskonia players
Small forwards
Undrafted National Basketball Association players
2014 FIBA Basketball World Cup players
2006 FIBA World Championship players
Goodwill Games medalists in basketball
Competitors at the 2001 Goodwill Games
Pan American Games competitors for Argentina
Sportspeople from Santa Fe Province